Satellite Award for Best Actress - Musical or Comedy can refer to:

 Satellite Award for Best Actress – Motion Picture Musical or Comedy or
 Satellite Award for Best Actress – Television Series Musical or Comedy